The Roman Catholic Diocese of Joaçaba is a Roman Catholic diocese centered in the city of Joaçaba in the Ecclesiastical province of Florianópolis, in Santa Catarina state, Brazil. The seat of the diocese is located on the Cathedral of St. Therese of the Child of Jesus, Joaçaba. It is bordered by the Catarinense dioceses of Chapecó, Caçador and Lages, as well as the dioceses of Erexim and Vacaria on the south and the diocese of Palmas–Francisco Beltrão on the north.

History
 12 June 1975: Established from the dioceses of Caçador, Chapecó and Lages.

Bishops
 Bishops of Joaçaba (Roman rite)
 Bishop Mario Marquez, O.F.M. Cap. (2010.12.22 - present); formerly Auxiliary Bishop of the Roman Catholic Diocese of Vitoria, Brazil
 Bishop Walmir Alberto Valle, I.M.C. (2003.04.09 – 2010.04.14)
 Bishop Osório Bebber, O.F.M. Cap. (1999.03.17 – 2003.04.09)
 Bishop Henrique Müller, O.F.M. (1975.06.27 – 1999.03.17)

Coadjutor bishop
Walmir Alberto Valle, I.M.C. (2002-2003)

References
 GCatholic.org
 Catholic Hierarchy

Roman Catholic dioceses in Brazil
Christian organizations established in 1975
Joaçaba, Roman Catholic Diocese of
Roman Catholic dioceses and prelatures established in the 20th century
1975 establishments in Brazil